Leung King is an at-grade MTR  stop located at Tin King Road in Tuen Mun District, inside Leung King Shopping Centre in Leung King Estate. It began service on 24 September 1988 and belongs to Zone 3. It serves the Leung King Estate, Siu Lung Court, and Tin King Estate. It also includes a Light Rail customer service centre.

References

MTR Light Rail stops
Former Kowloon–Canton Railway stations
Tuen Mun
Railway stations in Hong Kong opened in 1988
MTR Light Rail stops named from housing estates